Jan Kaláb (born June 20, 1978 in Prague) is a Czech visual artist, whose art features vibrantly colored, abstract designs of organic shapes in various formats, including paintings, sculptures, installations, and street murals. Having started as a graffiti artist, Kaláb's artwork has appeared in Albin Polasek Museum, the National Czech & Slovak Museum & Library, the MAXXI National Museum of 21st-Century Arts (Rome), and the Czech Radio. His art has been reviewed in art news media including Novinky.cz, Lidové noviny, Creative Boom,  Aktuálně.cz, and iDNES.cz.

Career 
In his youth, Kaláb made street art in Prague, signing his works under the pseudonyms Cakes or Point. After several years as a graffiti artist, Kaláb entered the Academy of Fine Arts, Prague, earning a master's degree in 2006. Attracted by abstract Neoplasticism, his work moved from straight-lined sculptures and 3D alphabetic letter designs to work with the painted canvas, characterised by objects in organic shapes.

Exhibitions 

Kaláb had his first solo exhibition at the Trafo Gallery in Prague in 2008. Other solo shows of Kaláb's art in Prague took place in 2011, 2013, and 2015. Further solo exhibitions of his art have taken place in other cities, including Sofia (2011), Buenos Aires (2014), Bogota (2016), Berlin (2015), Paris (2016), Bologna (2017, 2019), London (2015, 2020), San Francisco (2018), Winter Park, FL (2018), Valencia (2019), Taipei (2019), and Miami (2019). Kaláb's artwork has also been included in collective art exhibitions in Amsterdam, Brno, Brooklyn, Göteborg, Hamburg, Krakow, Los Angeles, Manchester, Milan, Orebro, Putaux, Roma, Roudnice nad Labem, São Paulo, Shanghai, Stockholm, Völkliner, and Zlín.

Murals 
Mural painting is also a part of Kaláb's repertoire. His work was included in a monograph on mural art around the world published in 2010.

References

External links 

1978 births
Living people
20th-century Czech sculptors
20th-century male artists
21st-century Czech sculptors
Artists from Prague
Czech male sculptors